Theodoxus saulcyi is a species of small freshwater snail with an operculum, an aquatic gastropod mollusk in the family Neritidae, the nerites.

Distribution
This species occurs in:
 Greece

Description

References

External links

Neritidae
Gastropods described in 1852